KIISFM Extra is a radio station broadcasting on 95.8 MHz Stereo based in Corfu, Greece. It serves Corfu, the Ionian Islands, Epirus and the Western portion of Greece. KIISFM Extra broadcasts in one of the most scenic areas of the world and has a music policy to match. It is one of Greece's most popular stations and has a big listenership/following. KIISFM Extra has a perfect mixture of eighties (80's) along with today's biggest hits.

Anastasios Mexas is the program director from January 2014 and the owner of this station from November 2017.

History
Originally launched in 1994 as TOP FM Corfu. On 25 November 1997, it was relaunched and renamed as Energy (NRG) Corfu. On 8 January 2016, KISSFM relaunched as KIISFM Extra.

Further reading
Official Website
Official Player
Audio streaming

References 

Radio stations in Greece